The 2022 Acropolis Rally (also known as the EKO Acropolis Rally Greece 2022) was a motor racing event for rally cars that was held over four days between 8 and 11 September 2022. It marked the sixty-sixth running of the Acropolis Rally. The event was the tenth round of the 2022 World Rally Championship, World Rally Championship-2 and World Rally Championship-3.

Kalle Rovanperä and Jonne Halttunen were the defending rally winners. Their team, Toyota Gazoo Racing WRT, were the defending manufacturers' winners. Andreas Mikkelsen and Elliott Edmondson were the defending rally winners in the WRC-2 category. Kajetan Kajetanowicz and Maciej Szczepaniak were the defending rally winners in the WRC-3 category.

Thierry Neuville and Martijn Wydaeghe won their first rally of the season. Their team, Hyundai Shell Mobis WRT, were the manufacturer's winners. Emil Lindholm and Reeta Hämäläinen won the World Rally Championship-2 category. Diego Dominguez Jr. and Rogelio Peñate won the World Rally Championship-3 category. Robert Virves and Julia Thulin won the junior class and with the victory, Virves became the Junior Rally Champion.

Background

Entry list
The following crews entered into the rally. The event was opened to crews competing in the World Rally Championship, its support categories, the World Rally Championship-2 and World Rally Championship-3, and privateer entries that were registered to score points in any championship. Thirteen were enter under Rally1 regulations, as were thirty-five Rally2 crews in the World Rally Championship-2 and nine Rally3 crews in the World Rally Championship-3.

Itinerary
All dates and times are EEST (UTC+3).

Report

WRC Rally1

Classification

Special stages

Championship standings

WRC-2 Rally2

Classification

Special stages

Championship standings

WRC-3 Rally3

Classification

Special stages

Championship standings
Bold text indicates 2022 World Champions.

Notes

References

External links
  
 2022 Acropolis Rally at eWRC-results.com
 2022 Acropolis Rally at rally-maps.com 

Acropolis
Belgium
Acropolis Rally
September 2022 sports events in Greece